Athous campyloides is a species of beetle in the family Elateridae and the genus Athous.

Description
Length: .

References

External links
Information and Images of Athous campyloides

Beetles described in 1833
Taxa named by Edward Newman
Dendrometrinae